Latos may refer to:

Latis, Celtic polytheism
Mat Latos (born 1987), American professional baseball pitcher
James Latos (born 1966), Canadian professional ice hockey coach and player
Tomasz Latos (born 1964), Polish politician